The People's Revolutionary Party of Benin was a political party in the People's Republic of Benin. It was founded in 1975 by General Mathieu Kérékou. With the new constitution of 30 November 1975, PRPB became the sole legal party in the country. Ideologically, the party stated it was committed to Marxism-Leninism, although in practice was broadly nationalist.

In the parliamentary elections of 1979, 1984 and 1989, PRPB was the only party contesting. In 1979, the lists of the party received 1,243,286 votes (97.9%), in 1984 the lists of the party received 1,811,208 votes (98.1%) and in 1989 the lists of the party received 1,695,860 votes (89.6%).

In 1989, the party renounced Marxism-Leninism as its official ideological guidance. It remained the governing force of Benin until 1990. The party was dissolved in 1990 and succeeded by the Union of Forces of Progress.

Electoral history

Presidential elections

National Revolutionary Assembly elections

See also 
National League of Patriotic Youth

References

Political parties established in 1975
Communist parties in Benin
Parties of one-party systems
Formerly ruling communist parties
Defunct political parties in Benin
Political parties disestablished in 1990
1975 establishments in Benin